Greenwood Terrace is a Home Ownership Scheme and Private Sector Participation Scheme court in Chai Wan, Hong Kong Island, Hong Kong near Chai Wan Division Police Station. It was jointly developed by the Hong Kong Housing Authority and New World Development, and has a total of seven residential blocks built in 1985 and is one of the largest estates in Chai Wan.

Houses

Demographics
According to the 2016 by-census, Greenwood Terrace had a population of 6,342. The median age was 45.6 and the majority of residents (93.9 per cent) were of Chinese ethnicity. The average household size was 3.2 people. The median monthly household income of all households (i.e. including both economically active and inactive households) was HK$43,000.

Politics
Greenwood Terrace is located in Lok Hong constituency of the Eastern District Council. It was formerly represented by Tsang Kin-shing, who was elected in the 2019 elections until July 2021.

See also

Public housing estates in Chai Wan and Siu Sai Wan

References

Residential buildings completed in 1985
New World Development
Home Ownership Scheme
Private Sector Participation Scheme
Chai Wan
Housing estates with centralized LPG system in Hong Kong